Michal Doležal may refer to:

 Michal Doležal (footballer) (born 1977), Czech football midfielder
 Michal Doležal (ski jumper) (born 1978), Czech ski jumper